The 2016 Indian Premier League Final was a day/night Twenty20 cricket match on 29 May 2016 at the M. Chinnaswamy Stadium, Bangalore, which was played between Sunrisers Hyderabad and Royal Challengers Bangalore to determine the winner of the 2016 season of the Indian Premier League, an annual Twenty20 cricket tournament in India. In case play was not completed on 29 May, the Final would have resumed on 30 May, the allotted reserve day.

Winning the toss, Sunrisers Hyderabad elected to bat first and set up a big total of 208/7 off 20 overs for their opposition. While chasing 209 to win, Royal Challengers Bangalore could only manage 200/7 off their 20 overs, thus falling short of their target. Sunrisers Hyderabad won the match by 8 runs and secured the 2016 Indian Premier League trophy, which happens to be their maiden title in the history of the tournament.

Ben Cutting of Sunrisers Hyderabad was declared the man of the match in the Final, Virat Kohli of Royal Challengers Bangalore was declared the most valuable player of the tournament and Mustafizur Rahman of Sunrisers Hyderabad was declared as the emerging player of the season for the 2016 Indian Premier League.

Road to the final

League stage

League stage series

Playoff stage

Final

Background
On 26 April, the Supreme Court dismissed the petition against the Bombay High Court's ruling and confirmed that matches should be moved out of Maharashtra including Final which was initially supposed to be held at Mumbai, home of previous season champions. On 29 April, it was announced that all league stage matches scheduled to be held after 1 May in Mumbai and Pune were shifted to the Dr. Y.S. Rajasekhara Reddy ACA-VDCA Cricket Stadium in Visakhapatnam and M. Chinnaswamy Stadium in Bangalore, which was scheduled to host the Qualifier 1, was also announced as the host of the Final.

The final was played at M. Chinnaswamy Stadium, Bangalore, the home of Royal Challengers Bangalore, one of the finalist in 2016 Indian Premier League. This was RCB's third appearance in an IPL final, having lost previous two times. Sunrisers Hyderabad were playing in their maiden final. Hyderabad and Bangalore share their head-to-head record 4-4 but Hyderabad won only once against Bangalore in Bangalore.

Bangalore scored past 200 runs three times (four times after this match) this season including in a match against Hyderabad.

Summary
After winning the toss, Sunrisers Hyderabad captain  David Warner opted to bat first and were given a good start by skipper David Warner and Shikhar Dhawan by showing their intent early on scoring very big on a ground where tall scores have been chased down nonchalantly. The Australian opener was on fire and smashed 69 off 38 balls and set the platform for Hyderabad's win. Yuvraj Singh, who came in at 97/2 in 10th over, sustained Hyderabad's momentum with his free flowing bat-swing. He raced to 38 with four fours and two sixes before falling to Jordan's slower ball. Ben Cutting provided final push in Hyderabad's score clobbering low full-tosses and attempted yorkers of Shane Watson scoring 24 runs in final over which proved at the end to be a valuable match-turning point.

RCB skipper Virat Kohli and West Indian Chris Gayle gave their team the perfect start and in no time reached the 100-run mark without any loss scoring 114 in 10.3 overs with Gayle alone contributing 76. But Hyderabad were able to apply brakes with Gayle's wicket. Hyderabad were able to continue to put pressure on Bangalore taking Gayle, Kohli and de Villiers in the space of 20 balls. Still needing 61 off 37 balls, Watson tried to make up for his lapses with the ball swatting Henriques for a six over long-on but was immediately dismissed along with KL Rahul leaving rest of the team with too much to do in too little time. Bhuvneshwar Kumar, Purple Cap holder in this season, held composure in last overs delivering successive yorkers and giving just 14 runs in 18th and 20th over combined and helped Hyderabad lift their maiden Indian Premier League trophy.

Scorecard
 On-field umpires: Kumar Dharmasena, Bruce Oxenford
 Third umpire: Anil Chaudhary
 Match referee: Ranjan Madugalle
 Reserve umpire: Abhijit Deshmukh
 Toss: Sunrisers Hyderabad elected to bat first
 Result: Sunrisers Hyderabad won by eight runs
 League impact: Sunrisers Hyderabad won the 2016 Indian Premier League

Source : Scorecard on ESPNcricinfo

Key
 * – Captain
  – Wicket-keeper
 c Fielder – the batsman was dismissed by a catch by the named fielder
 b Bowler – the bowler who gains credit for the dismissal
 lbw – the batsman was dismissed leg before wicket
 Total runs are in the format: score/wickets
 b  – Bye, lb  – Leg bye, nb  – No-ball, wd  – Wide, RR  – Run rate

References

Final
2016 in Indian cricket